There was a large and thriving community of Jews, both religious and secular, in Czechoslovakia before World War II. Many perished during the Holocaust. Today, nearly all of the survivors have inter-married and assimilated into Czech and Slovak society.

Academics and scientists

Engineering
 Itzhak Bentov, inventor
 Daniel Mandl (1891–1944), civil engineer, inventor, victim of the Holocaust

Social science
 Guido Adler (1855–1941), musicologist, composer, writer, born in Ivančice (Eibenschütz), Moravia
 Yehuda Bauer, Czech-born Israeli historian of the Holocaust
 Samuel Bergman, philosopher
 Pavel Bergmann, historian, philosopher and political activist; signatory of charter 77; nephew of Hugo Bergmann
 Berthold Bretholz, Moravian historian
 Vilém Flusser (1920–1991), self-taught philosopher
 Ernest Gellner (1925–1995), philosopher and social anthropologist
 Stephan Korner, philosopher
 Ernest Nagel, philosopher
 Samuel Steinherz (1857–1942), Czechoslovak mediaevalist

Mathematics
 Nikolai Brashman (1796–1866), mathematician
 David Gans (1541–1613), mathematician
 Joseph Kohn (born 1932), mathematician
 Ernst Kolman (1892–1972), philosopher of mathematics
 Charles Loewner (1893–1968), mathematician
 Assaf Naor (born 1975), mathematician
 Alfred Tauber (1866–1942), mathematician
 Olga Taussky-Todd (1906–1995), mathematician

Medicine
 Sigmund Freud (1856–1939), neurologist, founder of psychoanalysis; born in Příbor (Freiberg), Moravia
 Carl Koller (1857–1944), ophthalmologist
Pavol Steiner (1908–1969), Olympic water polo player, swimmer, and cardiac surgeon
 Rudolf Vrba (1924–2006), pharmacologist (born in Slovakia)

Natural science
 Gerty Cori (1896–1957), biochemist
 Martin Fleischmann, chemist

Arts/entertainment
 Bedřich Feuerstein (1892–1936), architect, painter and essayist
 Miloš Forman (1932-2018), film director, actor and script writer
 Juraj Herz (born 1934), film director, actor, and scenic designer (born in Slovakia)
 Arnošt Goldflam (born 1946), playwright, writer, director, screenwriter and actor
 Hugo Haas (1901–1968), actor and film director
 Miloš Kopecký (1922–1996), actor
 Hugo Lederer (1871–1940), sculptor
 Francis Lederer (1899–2000), actor
 Herbert Lom (1917–2012), actor
 Robert Maxwell (1923–1991), media mogul
 Emil Orlik (1870–1932), painter
 Alfréd Radok (1917–1976), writer and director in theater and film
 Karel Reisz (1926–2002), film director
 Ivan Reitman (born 1946), film director (born in Slovakia)
 Emery Roth (1871–1948), architect (born in Sečovce at the present-day territory of Slovakia)
 Jan Saudek (born 1935), art photographer
 Anna Ticho (1894–1980), artist
 Jiří Weiss (1913–2004), film director and screenwriter
 Adrianna Demiany (née Roskovanyi) (born 1942), Slovak-Hungarian-Canadian Journalist (Born in Košice at the present-day territory of Slovakia)

Athletes
 Kurt Epstein (1904–1975), Czechoslovak national water polo team, Olympic competitor, incarcerated by the Nazis in Theresienstadt and Auschwitz
 Arie Gill-Glick (1930–2016), Israeli Olympic runner
Ladislav Hecht (1909–2004), Czechoslovak-American tennis player, world #6
 Gertrude "Traute" Kleinová (1918–1976), table tennis, three-time world champion, incarcerated by the Nazis in Theresienstadt and Auschwitz
Pavol Steiner (1908–1969), Olympic water polo player, swimmer, and cardiac surgeon
 Olga Winterberg (1922–2010), Israeli Olympian in the discus throw

Music
 Karel Ančerl (1908–1973), conductor, respected for his performances of contemporary music and particularly cherished for his interpretations of music by Czech composers
 Karel Berman (1919–1995), opera singer and composer
 Ignaz Brüll, composer and pianist
Arthur Chitz (1882–1944) musicologist, composer, pianist, and conductor
 Alexander Goldscheider (born 1950), composer and producer
 Alfred Grünfeld (1852–1924), pianist and composer
 Pavel Haas (1899–1944), composer
 Eduard Hanslick (1825–1904), music critic
 Gideon Klein (1919–1945), composer of classical music
 Eliška Kleinová (1912–1999), pianist, music educator; sister of Gideon Klein
 Erich Wolfgang Korngold (1897–1957), composer
 Hans Krása (1899–1944), composer
 Egon Ledeč (1889–1944), music composer
 Gustav Mahler (1860–1911), music composer and conductor, Czech-born
 Herbert Thomas Mandl (1926–2007), concert violinist, professor at the Janáček Academy of Music in Ostrava, Holocaust survivor who was a contemporary witness to the rich cultural life in the Theresienstadt (Terezín) ghetto
 Ignaz Moscheles (1794–1870), composer and piano virtuoso
 Zuzana Růžičková (1927–2017), contemporary harpsichordist, interpreter of classical and baroque music
 Erwin Schulhoff (1894–1942), composer and pianist
 Julius Schulhoff (1825–1898), pianist and composer
 Walter Susskind (1913–1980), conductor 
 Viktor Ullmann (1898–1944), composer, conductor and pianist
 Jaromír Weinberger (1896–1967), composer

Politicians
 Victor Adler (1852–1918), socialist politician, born in Prague
 Madeleine Albright (born 1937), served as the 64th United States Secretary of State
 Ludwig Czech (1870–1942), leader and several times minister for the German Social Democratic Workers Party in the Czechoslovak Republic
 Jan Fischer (born 1951), prime minister of the Czech Republic (2009)
 Bruno Kafka (1881–1931), German-speaking Jewish Czech politician, leader from 1918 to his death of the Czechoslovak German Democratic Liberal Party, member of the National Assembly
 Ignaz Kuranda, politician
 Artur London (1915–1986), communist politician and co-defendant in the Slánský trial; born in Ostrava, Silesia, Austria-Hungary
 Rudolf Margolius (1913–1952), Deputy Minister of Foreign Trade (1949–1952), a victim of the Slánský trial
 Rudolf Slánský (1901–1952); Communist politician and the party's General Secretary after World War II; fell into disfavour with the regime and was executed after a show trial
 Michael Žantovský, politician and author; appointed to serve as the Ambassador to Israel in July 2003
 Vladimír Železný (born 1945), media businessman and politician, member of the European Parliament, founder of TV NOVA

Religious leaders
 Samuel Abramson, rabbi of Carlsbad
 Tzvi Ashkenazi, better known as Haham Zevi, chief rabbi of Amsterdam, prominent opponent of the Sabbateans
 Nehemiah Brüll, rabbi (born Rousínov, Moravia)
 Israel Bruna, rabbi (born Brno)
 Aaron Chorin, rabbi (born Moravia)
 Joseph H. Hertz (1872–1946), Chief Rabbi of the British Empire
 Isaac ben Jacob ha-Lavan, Bohemian tosafist
 Judah Loew ben Bezalel (1525?–1609), rabbi
 Mordecai Meisel, Philanthropist and communal leader at Prague
 Karol Sidon, playwright, chief rabbi of Prague, and Convert to Judaism
Salomon Weisz, Cantor & Bar Mitzvah teacher in Znojmo and Trebic, Cantor of Moravia & Bar Mitzvah teacher in Prague from 1946 to 1968.

Writers
 Henri Blowitz, journalist
 Max Brod (1884–1968), author, composer, and journalist
 Avigdor Dagan (1912–2006), writer
 Egon Hostovsky (1908–1973), writer
 Franz Kafka (1883–1924), novelist
 Siegfried Kapper (1821–1879), writer
 Ivan Klíma (born 1931), novelist, playwright
 Leopold Kompert (1822–1886), author
 Heda Margolius Kovály, author and translator
 František R. Kraus (1903–1967), writer, journalist and reporter; wrote one of the first books ever about his experience in Auschwitz, published in 1945
 Arnošt Lustig (1926–2011), author of novels, short stories, plays and screenplays whose works have often involved the Holocaust
 Jiří Orten (1919–1941), poet
 Ota Pavel (1930–1973), writer, journalist and sport reporter
 Leopold Perutz (1882–1957), German language novelist and mathematician
 Karel Poláček (1892–1945), writer and journalist
 Tom Stoppard (born 1937), playwright, known for plays such as The Real Thing and Rosencrantz & Guildenstern Are Dead, and for the screenplay for Shakespeare in Love
 Hermann Ungar (1893–1929), writer of German language and an officer in the Ministry of Foreign Affairs of Czechoslovakia
 Jiří Weil (1900–1959), writer, novels Life with a Star (Život s hvězdou) and Mendelssohn is on the Roof
 Franz Werfel (1890–1945), Czech-born writer; married Mahler's widow

Other
 Jacob Bassevi (1580–1634), Bohemian Court Jew and financier
 George Brady (born 1928), brother of Hana Brady
 Hana Brady (1931–1944), Holocaust victim
 Izrael Zachariah Deutsch, deaf memoirist
 Salo Flohr (1908–1983), leading chess master of the early 20th century
 Tomáš Galásek, football player 
 Petr Ginz (1928–1944), boy deported to the Terezín concentration camp during the Holocaust
 Isaak Löw Hofmann, Edler von Hofmannsthal (1759–1849), merchant
 Frank Lowy (born 1930), businessman
 Richard Réti (1889–1929), chess grandmaster
 Yoshua Samuel Rusnak (also "Yehoshua Sh'mu'el Rusnak"; died 1915), diasporan Jew and Zionist based in Kosice, Slovakia; many of his family members were murdered in the Holocaust at Auschwitz
 Wilhelm Steinitz (1836–1900), first World Chess Champion
 Irene Capek (1925–2006), Jewish holocaust survivor, humanitarian and local Australian politician

See also
 History of the Jews in the Czech Republic
 History of the Jews in Slovakia
 List of Austrian Jews
 List of Czechs
 List of East European Jews

References

Footnotes

 
 
Czech
Jews
Jews
Jews,Czech